Under a Shadow (aka Under The Shadow) is a 1915 American silent drama film directed by Joe De Grasse and featuring Lon Chaney. It was written by F. McGrew Willis, based on a story he wrote entitled "A Secret Service Affair". The film is today considered to be lost.

Plot
Thera Dufre, a former foreign secret service agent, now in hiding from government agents, receives a letter ordering her to deliver a sealed packet to a Mr. DeSerris (Lon Chaney) at a specific location. DeSerris waits at the appointed place when a woman named Alice Irving, who bears a striking resemblance to Thera, passes by and is confronted by DeSerris who mistakes her for the secret agent. Alice escapes, but her jealous husband Mr. Irving sees DeSerris following Alice, and when Alice tells him that she has no idea who the man is, he refuses to believe her.

Later DeSerris confronts Alice again as she tries to enter her house, and orders her to turn over the packet. Mr. Irving sees them and confronts DeSerris with a pistol. Alice tries to grab the gun, and in the ensuing struggle, Alice's daughter is shot. Thera Dufre, who realizes that DeSerris has mistaken Alice for her, sees this as her chance to escape, but she is struck by the Irving's car as they attempt to rush their wounded child to a hospital. Mr. Irving sends her back to his house with the butler, and is struck by the uncanny resemblance of the woman to his wife.

Thera hides when Alice enters, and once again DeSerris breaks in and mistakenly attacks the innocent Alice. Thera shoots DeSerris dead, and after Alice faints, Thera places the revolver next to the unconscious Alice. Thera plans to frame Alice for the murder of DeSerris when suddenly the phone rings. She answers the phone and it is Alice's husband and, thinking he is speaking to Alice, he tells her that their daughter will recover and begs her to forgive him for being so jealous. Realizing that Alice's family would be destroyed if she framed her for the murder, Thera calmly decides to remain at the murder scene and accept the blame when the police arrive.

Cast
 Gretchen Lederer as dual role as both Thera Dufre and as Alice Irving
 Lon Chaney as DeSerris
 Arthur Shirley as Mr. Irving (Alice's husband)
 Millard K. Wilson as Foreign Agent

Reception
"A fair melodrama that contains as its strong point much exciting action. In fact the action causes one to disregard some of the unconvincing situations...The double exposure scenes are not very well handled." --- Motion Picture News

References

External links

1915 films
American silent short films
1915 short films
American black-and-white films
1915 drama films
Lost American films
Films directed by Joseph De Grasse
Universal Pictures short films
Silent American drama films
1915 lost films
Lost drama films
1910s American films